Baron Napier of Magdala, in Abyssinia and of Caryngton in the County Palatine of Chester, is a title in the Peerage of the United Kingdom. It was created in 1868 for the military commander Sir Robert Napier, in recognition of his part in the 1868 Expedition to Abyssinia when the town of Magdala was captured. Napier was later Commander-in-Chief in India and Governor of Gibraltar and was made a Field Marshal in 1882. He was succeeded by his eldest son, the second Baron. He served as Aide-de-Camp to his father. On his death the title passed to his younger brother, the third Baron. He was a Colonel in the British Army. He was succeeded by his half-brother, the fourth Baron. He worked for the Indian State Railways. His son, the fifth Baron, was a Brigadier in the Royal Engineers.  the title is held by the latter's son, the sixth Baron, who succeeded in 1987.

Barons Napier of Magdala (1868)
Robert George Cornelis Napier, 1st Baron Napier of Magdala (1810–1890)
Robert William Napier, 2nd Baron Napier of Magdala (1845–1921)
James Pearse Napier, 3rd Baron Napier of Magdala (1849–1935)
Edward Herbert Scott Napier, 4th Baron Napier of Magdala (1861–1948)
(Robert) John Napier, 5th Baron Napier of Magdala (1904–1987)
Robert Alan Napier, 6th Baron Napier of Magdala (b. 1940)

The heir apparent is the present holder's son the Hon James Robert Napier (b. 1966).

Arms

References

Baronies in the Peerage of the United Kingdom
Noble titles created in 1868
1868 establishments in the United Kingdom